WSIU-TV (channel 8) is a PBS member television station in Carbondale, Illinois, United States. It is owned by Southern Illinois University alongside NPR member WSIU (91.9 FM). The two stations share studios on the university's campus in Carbondale; WSIU-TV's transmitter is located along US 51 near Tamaroa, Illinois.

WSIU also operates full-time simulcast WUSI-TV (channel 16) in Olney, Illinois; from a transmitter on North Shipley Road (County Road 900 E) near Dundas, WUSI-TV serves the southeastern part of the state, including Olney and Effingham, and also covers Vincennes, Indiana. A digital replacement translator of WSIU-TV is located in Cape Girardeau, Missouri, on UHF channel 28. SIU also owns WSEC, based in Springfield, which leads a three-station network serving viewers in Springfield, Macomb, and Quincy.

History
SIU had been interested in educational television since 1950, but the educational television channel assigned to Carbondale—UHF channel 61—was deemed unsuitable as unable to cover a wide area. In 1958, the Federal Communications Commission (FCC) assigned VHF channel 8 in its stead, and the university announced it would file to use it. The FCC granted the WSIU construction permit on November 18, 1959 and add the -TV suffix to its call sign on January 1, 1960. Over the course of 1961, construction on the transmitter experienced a series of setbacks, but the station began broadcasting educational programs to 70 area schools on November 6, 1961.

In 1966, SIU obtained a construction permit to build a UHF station in Olney to rebroadcast WSIU-TV and expand its coverage area. WUSI-TV signed on August 19, 1968. From 1980 to 1982, the Olney station produced limited opt-out programming from the Carbondale station after receiving a $420,000 grant for equipment; however, budget cuts at SIU and the Corporation for Public Broadcasting led to these programs being dropped.

Programming
During Southern Illinois University's academic year, WSIU-TV broadcast a live student-produced newscast, River Region Evening Edition, which airs on Monday through Thursday evenings (on days when classes are held) at 5:00 p.m., with repeats of WSIU InFocus shown on Friday at 5:00 p.m. Three other student-produced programs also air on WSIU/WUSI, alt.news 26:46, Studio A, and Scholastic Hi-Q. Both alt.news 26:46 and Studio A occasionally air on the station on Sundays at 10:00 p.m. with Scholastic Hi-Q airing each Sunday at 5:00 p.m. Since WUSI-TV operates as a full-time satellite of WSIU-TV, it simulcasts the programs produced from WSIU-TV, with no local insertion.

Technical information

Subchannels
The stations' digital signals are multiplexed:

Translator

Analog-to-digital conversion
WSIU-TV shut down its analog signal, over VHF channel 8, at 9 p.m. on January 29, 2009. The station's digital signal relocated from its pre-transition UHF channel 40 to VHF channel 8 for post-transition operations.

WUSI-TV shut down its analog signal, over UHF channel 16, at 9 p.m. on February 17, 2009, the original target date in which full-power television stations in the United States were to transition from analog to digital broadcasts under federal mandate (which was later pushed back to June 12, 2009). The station's digital signal remained on its pre-transition UHF channel 19. Through the use of PSIP, digital television receivers display the station's virtual channel as its former UHF analog channel 16.

References

External links
Official website

PBS member stations
Television stations in the Paducah–Cape Girardeau–Harrisburg market
WSIU
WUSI
1961 establishments in Illinois
Carbondale, Illinois
Companies based in Jackson County, Illinois